Norris W. Overton (born January 6, 1926) is a retired brigadier general in the United States Air Force.

Biography
Overton was born on January 6, 1926, in Clarksville, Tennessee. He graduated from Crispus Attucks High School in Indianapolis, Indiana before attending Indiana University Bloomington and Harvard Business School.

Career
Overton was commissioned an officer in the Air Force in 1951. The following year, he was assigned to the 18th Fighter-Bomber Wing in Chinhai, China. Later assignments include being stationed at Bordeaux-Mérignac Air Base in France and Lindsey Air Station in West Germany. He also graduated from the Air Force Institute of Technology, the Industrial College of the Armed Forces and the Air War College.

In 1959, Overton was stationed in Wood-Ridge, New Jersey. The following year, he was stationed in Milwaukee, Wisconsin. In 1963, he was assigned to Karamürsel, Turkey.

From 1964 to 1968, Overton was Associate Professor of Aerospace Studies at the University of Iowa. He was then deployed to serve in the Vietnam War and stationed at Tan Son Nhut Air Base.

After returning to the United States, he was assigned to The Pentagon, the United States Air Force Academy and Pacific Air Forces. In 1979, Overton was named Vice Commander of the Army and Air Force Exchange Service. He retired in 1981.

Awards he received during his career include the Legion of Merit with oak leaf cluster, the Bronze Star Medal with oak leaf cluster, the Air Force Commendation Medal, the Outstanding Unit Award, the Republic of Korea Presidential Unit Citation and the Vietnam Gallantry Cross with palm.

After retiring from the Air Force, he worked for a time with Amtrak.

References

1926 births
Living people
People from Clarksville, Tennessee
People from Indianapolis
United States Air Force generals
Recipients of the Legion of Merit
Recipients of the Gallantry Cross (Vietnam)
United States Air Force personnel of the Vietnam War
Indiana University alumni
Harvard Business School alumni
Air Force Institute of Technology alumni
Dwight D. Eisenhower School for National Security and Resource Strategy alumni
University of Iowa faculty
Air War College alumni